Aaron Diehl (born September 22, 1985) is an American jazz pianist.

Diehl is considered a jazz virtuoso and composer. He is the 2014 Monterey Jazz Festival Commission Artist, becoming one of the youngest artists to receive this honor, and composed Three Streams of Expression, dedicated to pianist and composer John Lewis. He is the 2013 recipient of the Jazz Journalists Association Award for Up-And-Coming Artist, the 2012 Prix du Jazz Classique recipient for his album Live at the Players from the Académie du Jazz, and is the winner of the 2011 Cole Porter Fellowship from the American Pianists Association. Diehl's most recent album, Space, Time, Continuum features Benny Golson and Joe Temperley (June 2015, Mack Avenue Records)

Biography

Diehl grew up in a nurturing musical environment. His grandfather, pianist/trombonist Arthur Baskerville, was one of his first influences. He would eventually become the pianist at his family's Black Catholic church.

He began studying classically at age 7 and discovered his passion for jazz music when attending Interlochen Summer Camp. There, he met piano prodigy Eldar Djangirov, who made a lasting impression on Diehl through his enthusiasm for Oscar Peterson and Art Tatum.

In 2002, Diehl was a finalist in Jazz at Lincoln Center's Essentially Ellington competition, where he was awarded "Outstanding Soloist." The following year, he was invited to tour with the Wynton Marsalis Septet on their European tour. A 2007 graduate of the Juilliard School, he studied with Kenny Barron, Oxana Yablonskaya and Eric Reed.

Diehl released his first live album in 2009, a solo concert recorded at the Caramoor Festival. In 2010, Live at the Players featured two of his trios: David Wong and Paul Sikivie (bass), and Quincy Davis and Lawrence Leathers (drums).  The Bespoke Man’s Narrative (2013), Diehl’s debut album on Mack Avenue Records, reached No.1 on the JazzWeek Jazz Chart and is described as "honest music that invites you back in to discover new wonders with each listening."

Diehl has currently been on tour with the Grammy Award nominee jazz singer Cécile McLorin Salvant. Other internationally acclaimed artists and ensembles he has performed with include: Warren Wolf, Lew Tabackin, Matt Wilson, Wycliffe Gordon, the Jazz at Lincoln Center Orchestra and the New World Symphony.

Personal life

Diehl lives in Harlem and is a licensed pilot.
He is a graduate of St. Charles Preparatory School.

Diehl is Catholic.

Discography

As leader
 2009: Live at Caramoor
 2010: Live at The Players
 2013: The Bespoke Man’s Narrative (Mack Avenue)
 2015: Space Time Continuum (Mack Avenue)
 2020: The Vagabond (Mack Avenue)

Compilations 
 2013 - Live From The Detroit Jazz Festival - 2013 (Mack Avenue)
 2014 - It's Christmas on Mack Avenue (Mack Avenue)

References

External links
Official website
Mac Avenue Artist Page

1985 births
Living people
American jazz pianists
American male pianists
Musicians from Columbus, Ohio
Jazz musicians from Ohio
21st-century American pianists
21st-century American male musicians
American male jazz musicians
Mack Avenue Records artists
African-American Catholics
21st-century African-American musicians